"Stay the Night" is a song by Russian-German electronic dance music producer Zedd, from the deluxe edition (2013) of his debut studio album, Clarity  (2012). It features vocals from Hayley Williams, the lead singer of American rock group Paramore. The song was written by Zedd, Williams, Benjamin Eli Hanna (believed to be a secret moniker of Nate Ruess), and Carah Faye, and produced by Zedd. "Stay the Night" was released to digital retailers on September 10, 2013, by Interscope Records as the lead single off the deluxe edition of Clarity, and the fourth overall single from the album.

The song has been compared to Zedd's previous electro house hit "Clarity", with Critic of Music saying "Stay the Night" is primed for "pop radio". Digital Spy said the song was "generic EDM", and Idolator pointed to its EDM-style club-ready dance beats, "dreamy" synths, and a pop-style vocal. "Stay the Night" received critical acclaim, with some critics noting the song's potential for crossover appeal to audiences of mainstream pop.

The single reached the number one spot on both Billboards Hot Dance Club Songs and Dance/Mix Show Airplay charts in its December 7, 2013 issue, giving Zedd his second number one at Dance Airplay and his third chart-topper at Dance Club Play, while Williams marks her first number one on a Billboard chart (at Dance/Mix Show Airplay) as a solo artist.  Elsewhere, the track reached the top twenty in fifteen countries. The song has sold over two million copies in the U.S. by September 2017.

Critical reception
Idolator editor Mike Wass called the song "another soaring house anthem with massive crossover potential" and praised the "inspired" choice of vocalist: "Hayley Williams puts her trademark angsty rock leanings to the side ... and she lends the track a certain credibility outside the ever-growing EDM market."

James Shotwell of the entertainment news blog Under the Gun Review gave "Stay the Night" a mixed review. While stating the song "is destined for dance club glory" and will "fit nicely" on contemporary hit radio, Shotwell also criticized its lack of uniqueness.

Music blog Critic of Music gave the song an A− rating, noting that while the song suffers in comparison to previous single "Clarity", particularly in the weakness of its lyrics, "Stay the Night" is still successful at highlighting Williams' "vocal versatility" and Zedd's "excellent, radio-friendly" dance beats.

"Stay the Night" won the MTV Clubland Award in the 2014 MTV Video Music Awards.

Track listing

Charts

Weekly charts

Year-end charts

Decade-end charts

Certifications

Release history

See also
 List of number-one dance singles of 2013 (U.S.)

References

External links 

Zedd songs
2012 songs
2013 songs
2013 singles
Number-one singles in Scotland
Interscope Records singles
Songs written by Hayley Williams
Songs written by Zedd
Hayley Williams songs